Bob Page (born August 14, 1953) is an American blues, stride and boogie-woogie piano player.

Originally from Damariscotta, Maine, Page moved to Atlanta, Georgia in the early 1980s, and continued a career of recording and live performance in the southeast United States, as well as elsewhere in the US and Europe.

In addition to his solo and band performances, Page has toured with the southern rock band The Georgia Satellites. He also regularly performs in a duo with the jazz pianist John Cocuzzi. He has written numerous songs and performed with musicians including Francine Reed and Maria Muldaur.

Select discography

Recorded performances with other musicians:

References

External links
Bob Page official site
Bob Page CD Baby site

1953 births
Living people
Songwriters from Maine
Boogie-woogie pianists
American blues pianists
American male pianists
Musicians from Maine
People from Damariscotta, Maine
Musicians from Atlanta
Songwriters from Georgia (U.S. state)
20th-century American pianists
21st-century American pianists
20th-century American male musicians
21st-century American male musicians
American male songwriters